Khaidi may refer to:

 Khaidi Kannaiah, a 1962 Telugu-language film
 Khaidi Babai, a 1974 Telugu-language film
 Khaidi (1983 film), a 1983 Telugu-language film
 Khaidi (1984 film), a 1984 Kannada-language film
 Khaidi Rudraiah, a 1986 Telugu-language film
 Khaidi No. 786, a 1988 Telugu-language film
 Khaidi No. 150, a 2017 Telugu-language film